Lisa Scott-Lee (born 5 November 1975) is a Welsh singer and member of the pop group Steps, formed in 1997.  Scott-Lee signed a record deal with Mercury Records and launched a solo career in 2003 although her success was limited after the release her debut single "Lately", and was dropped after her second single. She released her debut solo album Never or Now in 2007 through Concept Records.

Early life and education
Lisa Scott-Lee was born on 5 November 1975 in St Asaph, Denbighshire, Wales to parents Anthony and Janet. Her younger siblings are Andy, Anthony and Steven, who were in the band 3SL. Scott-Lee's great-grandfather was Chinese. Scott-Lee attended the Italia Conti Academy of Theatre Arts stage school.

Career

1997–2001: early career with Steps

Scott-Lee is a member of the UK pop group Steps.  The group, which came together in 1997 and had 14 top 5 singles in the UK, split up on Boxing Day 2001 before reforming in May 2011.

Ever since the group's break-up, rumours had been circulating that they would reunite in one form or another. In 2009, Lee Latchford-Evans revealed that the group had been approached to perform a series of concerts. He hinted that a future reunion was possible, but that "it isn't the right time right now".

2002–2008: Solo career and Totally Scott-Lee
Scott-Lee spent a short time managing her three younger brothers, including Andy, in a group of their own called 3SL. After little success they were dropped from their label and split up. Scott-Lee decided she would go solo and was signed to Mercury Records.  She released in April 2003 with her debut single, "Lately", which she co-wrote. The single was released on 12 May 2003 and peaked in the singles chart at number 6. On 8 September 2003, Scott-Lee released her second single (which she also co-wrote), "Too Far Gone", which entered the charts at number 11. Mercury parted company with Scott-Lee when they feared her success might be limited. She was left without a record company. As a result, her album, Unleashed, was cancelled, although promotional samplers had already been released.

Scott-Lee went on to be featured in the Girls of FHM music video for "Do You Think I'm Sexy?" in the summer of 2004, all the while preparing to release a new single. The single, "Get It On", was a collaboration between Intenso Project and Scott-Lee.  At the time the song was created they had yet to score a record deal for the song and were forced to self-fund the video.  Eventually Ministry of Sound picked the song up and it was released on 28 November 2004.  Despite numerous personal appearances, various promotional events, and a B-list placing on Capital Radio, the song's highest place on the charts was at number 23.  The "Get It On" music video was ranked in the FHM top 100 sexiest music videos. She performed on Saturday night takeaway on 11 March to publicise her comeback tour.

In the summer of 2005 it was revealed that a camera crew from MTV UK had been following Scott-Lee for nearly a year, tracking her life and those of her husband (Johnny Shentall of Hear'Say), her brother (Andy Scott-Lee), former publicist (Sean Borg), 80s pop singer turned music manager (Nathan Moore), and her brother's girlfriend Michelle Heaton (of Liberty X). The show was to be the UK version of MTV's US hit Newlyweds: Nick and Jessica. As time passed more information was revealed. The show, titled Totally Scott-Lee (originally Scott-Lee Unlimited) was to follow Scott-Lee's efforts to put her solo career back on track. In the show Lisa stated that she wanted to score a top ten hit with her next single or she would quit the music industry.

Scott-Lee was signed to a small record label, Concept Records, and began recording songs for her next single. Concept chose "Electric" and started making plans for its release. The single had to be released on 10 October 2005 to meet with deadlines for the show, with the chart position to be revealed live to Lisa on MTV on Sunday 16th October 2005.  Roseann McBride, assistant to managing director Max Bloom of Concept Records has gone on record (on the show and in private) several times saying that she was against the record being released on this date. One of the main reasons for this was that it would have very little promotion time (5 weeks as opposed to the usual 8–10 weeks). The song was released as planned but despite a television show backing her and extensive media coverage it failed to reach the top ten, charting at number 13.

Following the chart reveal Lisa said in the show that she deeply regretted agreeing to quit the music business. She said that she only went along with it to please other people and wished she had never said it. The final episode of the series focused on Lisa's reaction and the reactions of the people around her as she came to terms with the result.

Following the failure of "Electric" to achieve its targeted top 10 position (by only around 500 or so, after selling well over 8000), plans were announced to release "Electric" in Japan, Australia, Germany and South Africa. In Australia, "Electric" spent two weeks in the Top 100, but failed to chart in the Top 40. She went to South Africa and Germany to promote the single, but did not go to Australia. Despite the failure to chart, the album was released in Australia. Scott-Lee released "Boy on the Dancefloor", a song from her unreleased album, on her website as a Christmas gift to her fans in 2005. The MP3 download came with a note which read: "Merry Xmas from Lisa and all of the LSL team, we hope you love this free Xmas gift and have a great time singing and dancing along."

On 1 October 2006 it was announced that Scott-Lee would "film a great new TV show for mainstream TV" on her official website. It later emerged that the TV show in question was the second series of ITV's Dancing On Ice, although this was not officially confirmed until late December 2006. Her participation in Dancing On Ice began on 20 January 2007. On 24 February 2007 she lost in the dance off on the Dancing on Ice TV show finishing in 6th place. Scott-Lee's association with Dancing On Ice continued between March and May 2007 when she took part in Dancing on Ice: The Tour which toured across the UK.

Scott-Lee's first full-length solo album was Never or Now. The UK digital release date was supposed to be 26 March, presumably to capitalise on her success in Dancing On Ice. However, following her defeat in the sixth episode, the debut album was delayed again. It was released in South Africa by Sheer Music on 26 March 2007 and in the UK as a music download on 18 June 2007. A CD version was also released in Belgium and the Netherlands. On 16 July, the album had an import release and was confirmed by Play.com and Amazon.co.uk.
Scott-Lee appeared in the 2007 Christmas special of the Ricky Gervais comedy Extras.  She appeared in the Derby pantomime as 'Jack's wife' alongside her husband Johnny Shentall who played 'A Beanstalk' in 2007–08. In September 2008, Scott-Lee was a contestant on ITV2's flight attendant-based reality series CelebAir alongside husband Johnny. On 2 October 2008. the pair were eliminated from the show in the fifth week, after abandoning their cabin crew duties to party for two hours at Eden.

2011–2022: Steps reformation
Steps reformed in May 2011 for a four-part documentary series on Sky Living titled Steps: Reunion. The series started airing on 28 September, following an announcement of a second greatest hits album, The Ultimate Collection, that was released on 10 October 2011. The album entered the charts at number one, becoming the band's third album to achieve this feat. The second series of Steps: Reunion titled "Steps: On the Road Again" aired on Sky Living in April 2012; the series followed the band as they embarked on their sellout 22-date UK tour. On 24 September 2012, the group confirmed they would release their fourth studio album Light Up The World on 12 November 2012, alongside a six-date Christmas tour, starting from 30 November and ending on 5 December. The group reformed for a second time on 1 January 2017 in celebration of their 20th anniversary, and later announced their fifth studio album Tears on the Dancefloor, which was released in April 2017 and entered the charts at number 2. On 5 March 2017, the group confirmed the release of the new album, alongside its lead single, "Scared of the Dark", and a 22-date tour, Party on the Dancefloor. A deluxe edition of the album, titled Tears on the Dancefloor: Crying at the Disco, was released on 27 October.

In November 2017, Faye Tozer announced that the reunion was no longer just a 20th-anniversary celebration and that the group intends to continue after their 2018 Summer of Steps tour. In April 2018, Richards announced that following their summer tour, they would begin work on their sixth studio album. In February 2019, Richards announced the group would begin recording their next album during the summer months.

On 7 September 2020, via their social media accounts, Steps announced the release date of their album entitled What the Future Holds. The album was released on 27 November of the same year, with pre-orders available from 8 September. The next day, they confirmed a new 14-date UK tour (with special guest Sophie Ellis-Bextor) starting in November 2021. The first single from the album was the Greg Kurstin-and-Sia-penned "What the Future Holds", released on 9 September 2020. It was followed by "Something in Your Eyes" on 27 October 2020. "To the Beat of My Heart" was released as the album's third single in January 2021. 

The first single of What the Future Holds Pt. 2 was confirmed as a reworked version of "Heartbreak in This City" featuring Michelle Visage.

2023: Now or Never 20th anniversary 
On 27 February 2023, Scott-Lee announced an expanded deluxe version of the Never or Now studio album would be released, in celebration of twenty years since the release of her debut solo single, "Lately". She will also be performing a solo show at Mighty Hoopla festival on June 4th 2023 as part of the celebrations.

Personal life
Scott-Lee became engaged to former Steps dancer and Hear'Say singer, Johnny Shentall in April 2001 and they married on 14 August 2004. Together they have two children, a boy and a girl. The family lives in Dubai.
The family also resides in the Cotswolds.

Discography

Solo studio albums

 Never or Now (2007)

Singles

References

External links

Lisa Scott-Lee biography from BBC Wales

1975 births
Alumni of the Italia Conti Academy of Theatre Arts
21st-century Welsh women singers
Welsh pop singers
Living people
People from St Asaph
Welsh people of Chinese descent
Steps (group) members
Fontana Records artists
Mercury Records artists